Vundela Malakonda Reddy (23 August 1932 – 20 April 2022) was an engineer who is better known as a Telugu poet and great writer. He is also the founder of Chaitanya Bharathi Institute of Technology, Gandipet, Hyderabad. Reddy was born on 23 August 1932 in Inimerla, Prakasam district of Andhra Pradesh. He died on 20 April 2022 in Hyderabad, Telangana.

Career
Education:

Allur, Nellore, Madras (Chennai), Edinburgh, Great Britain

Qualifications:

B.E. (Civil Engineering), M.Sc.(Structural Engineering), Ph.D. (Structural Engineering)

Service:

Civil Engineer, P.W.D., Andhra Pradesh (1955–57)
Lecturer, Osmania Engg. College, Hyd. (1957–61)
Professor, Head of Civil Engg., Regional Engg. College (NIT), Warangal (1961–1979)
Founder Principal & Secretary, Chaitanya Bharathi Institute of Technology, Gandipet, Hyderabad (1979–1990)
Chairman, Chaitanya Bharathi Educational Society (2000–2003)
Executive Secretary, Mediciti Institute of Medical Sciences, Ghanpur, Medchal Mandal R.R. Dt., A.P. (since 2002)
Member, Executive Council, J.N.T. University, Hyderabad (since 1996)

Poetry (Telugu)
 Netaji (1946)
 Vivekanandudu (1953)
 Kanthi Chakralu (1959)
 Mogali Rekulu (1981)
 Odesela Rallu (1986)
 Vilapinche Uttaram (1992)
 Satyam Sivam Sundaram (1996)

Poetry (English)
 Gloating Grass (1988) presented at 10th World Congress of Poets at Bangkok
 Special Number (1992) International Poets Academy, Madras

Awards
 Balasaraswathi - 1951
 Kavikireeti - 1986
 Mikhale Madhusudan Award - 1990
 Dasaradhi Award - 1990
 Creative Writing Award of Telugu University - 1991
 R.C.C. Design Competition Award by Indian Concrete Journal, Bombay - 1954
 Best Technical Paper Award of Institution of Engineers, A.P. -1972
 Entrepreneurship in Technical Education by ATA USA Award -1998
 American Biographical Institute Directory of distinguished Leadership Member-1998
 Fellow of A.P. Science Academy - 2003
 Indira Gandhi National Award - 2003
 Excellence in Science and Technology Award by ATA USA - 2004

References

1932 births
2022 deaths
Telugu poets
Indian male poets
20th-century Indian poets
Poets from Andhra Pradesh
20th-century Indian male writers
People from Prakasam district